Sofía Carolina Carchipulla Enríquez (born 3 February 1990) is an Ecuadorian footballer who plays as a midfielder for CSD Independiente del Valle. She has been a member of the Ecuador women's national team.

International career
Carchipulla played for Ecuador at senior level in the 2014 Copa América Femenina.

References

1990 births
Living people
Women's association football midfielders
Ecuadorian women's footballers
People from Babahoyo
Ecuador women's international footballers
21st-century Ecuadorian women